Kingsbridge Community College is a co-educational secondary school and sixth form with academy status, located in Kingsbridge in the English county of Devon.

Previously a foundation school administered by Devon County Council, Kingsbridge Community College converted to academy status on 1 January 2011. However the school continues to coordinate with Devon County Council for admissions.
 
Kingsbridge Community College offers GCSEs and BTECs as programmes of study for pupils, while students in the sixth form have the option to study from a range of A Levels, NVQs and further BTECs.

References

External links
Kingsbridge Community College official website

Secondary schools in Devon
Academies in Devon
Kingsbridge